William Van der Pol (17 April 1938 – 14 July 2022) is a Canadian water polo player. He competed in the men's tournament at the 1972 Summer Olympics.

See also
 Canada men's Olympic water polo team records and statistics
 List of men's Olympic water polo tournament goalkeepers

References

External links
 

1938 births
2022 deaths
Canadian male water polo players
Canadian people of Dutch descent
Water polo goalkeepers
Olympic water polo players of Canada
Water polo players at the 1972 Summer Olympics
People from 's-Gravenzande